Holme railway station was located on the line between  and Watlington in Norfolk, England. It served the parish of Runcton Holme, and closed in 1853.

History

The Lynn & Ely Railway Bill received the Royal Assent on 30 June 1845. Work started on the line in 1846 and the line and its stations were opened on 27 October 1846. Holme Gate Station opened with the line and was situated South of St. Germain's Station and north of Stow Station. The line ran from Ely to Downham, the eventual destination being Ely.

References

Former Great Eastern Railway stations
Railway stations in Great Britain opened in 1846
Railway stations in Great Britain closed in 1853
Disused railway stations in Norfolk